Victoria Park, formerly called Causeway Bay North, is one of the 13 constituencies of the Wan Chai District Council of Hong Kong. The seat elects one member of the council every four years. It was first created in Hong Kong district board elections, 1994. The constituency boundary is loosely based on the residential area east of the Victoria Park with estimated population of 13,412. Prior to the District Council election in 2015, it was a constituency of the Eastern District Council.

Councillors represented

1982 to 1988

1988 to 1991

1991 to present

Election results

2010s

2000s

1990s

1980s

Notes

References

Constituencies of Hong Kong
Constituencies of Eastern District Council
Constituencies of Wan Chai District Council
1982 establishments in Hong Kong
Constituencies established in 1982
1994 establishments in Hong Kong
Constituencies established in 1994